The Anti-War Committee (AWC) is a grassroots political organization based in Minneapolis, Minnesota that wants to end U.S. intervention.

Organizational history

The Anti-War Committee began in December 1998, with 13 people who committed civil disobedience to protest the bombing of Iraq. The Anti-War Committee grew out of the Twin Cities chapter of the Committee in Solidarity with the People of El Salvador (CISPES), which had been active since the early 1980s. The Anti-War Committee has organized and been involved with most of the anti-war protests in the Twin Cities since its founding in 1998. The Anti-War Committee's main issues have been ending US aid to Israel and Colombia and ending the US occupations of Afghanistan and Iraq.

Mission and focus
The mission of the Anti-War Committee is to organize a broad-based movement which stands in solidarity with those communities, here and abroad who are adversely affected by U.S. foreign policies.

The AWC works on many issues, with a focus on US foreign policy. Its members believe that the U.S. government has no right to intervene, militarily, economically or politically, in the affairs of independent nations.

The Anti-War Committee calls for immediate withdrawal of all coalition troops from Iraq and Afghanistan, and has collaborated with other groups to organize many protests and other activities toward that goal. They are also opposed to U.S. military aid to Israel and to Colombia.

The Anti-War Committee was the first organization to apply for permits and announce plans to protest at the 2008 Republican National Convention, which was held in St. Paul, Minnesota.

On September 24, 2010, the Anti-War Committee's office was raided by the FBI. Several of its leading members also had their homes raided by the FBI. The Anti-War Committee is being investigated for "material support for terrorism". The AWC feels they are being targeted by the FBI for their solidarity work with Palestine and Colombia and were a part of founding the Committee to Stop FBI Repression nationally to defend their right to organize and protest.

In 2018 the Anti-War Committee lead a protest of over 10,000 people to protest Trump's Muslim ban.

Coalitions and other issues
The Anti-War Committee participates in the Iraq Peace Action Coalition (IPAC) now called the Minnesota Peace Action Coalition, the Coalition for Palestinian Rights (CPR) the Colombia Action Network (CAN), the Coalition for Justice for Jamar Clark, and is affiliated with the University of Minnesota Anti-War Organizing League (AWOL). The AWC also concerns itself with other issues, such as with the Welfare Rights Committee; supporting striking unions, such as during the Northwest Airlines Mechanics strike in 2005-2006 or the Alina nurses strike in 2016; and participating in the immigrant rights protests of 2006.

See also
Junkyard Empire
 List of anti-war organizations

Media coverage
Anti-war march challenges McCain on last day of RNC: Crowd repeatedly tear gassed, 396 arrested as police pull out all stops to prevent anti-war march from reaching Xcel Center Fight Back! News (retrieved September 16, 2008)
Anti-war protesters already planning for GOP convention KARE11.com (retrieved November 28, 2006)
One year later, peace activists not giving up Minnesota Public Radio, dated March 19, 2004 (retrieved November 28, 2006)
25 protesters plead not guilty Minnesota Daily, dated April 4, 2003 (retrieved November 28, 2006)
Anti-war protesters ramp up opposition Minnesota Public Radio, dated March 20, 2003 (retrieved November 28, 2006)
Antiwar groups blast Bush and outline protests starting today (Star Tribune, March 19, 2003 - retrieved November 28, 2006)

References

External links

Anti–Iraq War groups